Wyandotte is a city in Wayne County in the U.S. state of Michigan. The population was 25,058 at the 2020 census.

Wyandotte is bounded by Southgate to the west, Lincoln Park to the northwest, Riverview to the south, Grosse Ile Township to the southeast, Ecorse to the north, and LaSalle, Ontario on the east. Wyandotte is a sister city to Komaki, Japan, and each year delegates from Komaki come to Wyandotte to tour the city.

History
The site where Wyandotte sits today in the 18th century was a small village called by the native Indians "Maquaqua" and by the local French "Monguagon". This Native American tribe was known as the Wyandot or Wendat, and were part of the Huron nation originally from the Georgian Bay area of Canada.  Except for the intervening colonial war activities, when the Wyandots were forced through circumstances and treaty commitments with the Potawatomi living in the Ecorse area to engage in war against the English, the Wyandot Indians lived in peace with the few white farmers, exchanging products and favors.

It was from near here, along the banks of Ecorse Creek, now a northern boundary of the present-day city, that Chief Pontiac plotted his failed attack against the British garrisoned Fort of Detroit, in 1763. The center of the village was nearly parallel to Biddle Avenue between Oak Street and Eureka Road near the river and its sandy beach, which was a welcome feature to the local tribesmen, as their main mode of transportation to the fort in Detroit was by birch bark canoe. The tribe was considered peaceable and friendly with the British, the remaining French in the area, and the newly arrived Americans.

In 1818, the Wyandot signed a treaty with the U.S. government relinquishing this land, some moving to an area near Flat Rock, Michigan, then to Ohio, Kansas and finally Oklahoma; however, most of the Native Americans who lived in what is now Wyandotte, moved across the Detroit River to Anderdon, Windsor, Ontario, where their descendants live still today. The name somewhat lives on as Wyandotte County, Kansas.

Contemporary citizens have named Major Biddle the first white settler in Wyandotte, though there had been white farmers living in the territory before he established his home here. Major John Biddle had purchased 2,200 acres (9 km2) of land from the federal government in 1818. The wooded section by the river inspired the Major to become a farmer much in the manner of George Washington at Mount Vernon. He also built a summer estate. The buildings were completed around 1835, and he named his estate "Wyandotte" after the Indians who were still living in the area.

John S. Van Alstyne, general manager for Eber Ward of both the Eureka Iron & Steel Works and the associated Wyandotte Rolling Mills, laid out the master plan for the city.  This plan was frequently called the "Philadelphia Plan", with streets laid out on a north–south and east–west grid. The streets of the village were modeled after those in Philadelphia, which originated with William Penn. The focal point became the Detroit River, and the first street parallel became Front Street. This street was eventually extended and renamed Van Alstyne Boulevard in 1921. Streets running parallel to this Front Street were named according to numbers from First to the extent of the territory involved. Streets running horizontal to the numbered streets were named for trees and plants.

Founded as a village of Ecorse Township in 1854, Wyandotte was incorporated as a city, and granted a charter by the State of Michigan, on December 12, 1866, with the first city election held in April 1867, thus making it the oldest incorporated city in Wayne County other than Detroit. On April 8, 1867, the Village of Wyandotte was incorporated as a home rule city. A community named New Jerusalem consisting of immigrants from multiple nations was founded in the 1890s in what is now Wyandotte. It was incorporated as a village with the name of Glenwood in 1900. In 1901 a post office was established here with the name of Bacon since there was already a Glenwood post office in Wayne Township, Cass County, Michigan. Wyandotte annexed the community in 1905. The community of Ford City was founded as a village in 1902.  It was named for John B. Ford who ran the Michigan Alkali Company there.  In 1922 it merged with Wyandotte. On April 14, 1924, a large section of Ecorse Township was annexed to Wyandotte.

Wyandotte has been influenced by many nationalities, most notably the German, Polish, Irish and Italian communities. Wyandotte was also a sundown town, resulting in a troubled history with African Americans.

Geography

The Detroit River forms the eastern boundary of the city, and the uninhabited Grassy Island is administered by the city. The Ecorse River also forms a small northern boundary of the city.

Business and industry

An early figure was Captain John Baptiste Ford, who used the salt to create soda ash, which in turn was used to create plate glass. In 1893, he created Michigan Alkali Company, which created baking soda, soda ash and lye. The company, later renamed Wyandotte Chemicals Co., went on to create a variety of soaps and cleaners, eventually becoming part of BASF and expanding into the BASF industrial complex.

Ward also help create Wyandotte's shipbuilding role, which existed from the 1870s into the 1920s. During that time, a wide variety of boats were created along Wyandotte's riverbank, from steamers and tugs to huge ferries. In 1873, Ward's Wyandotte Iron Ship Building Works built the nation's earliest steel-hulled vessel, a tugboat called the Sport. This shipbuilding industry was immortalized in 1942 in the painting of several murals which still exist today in the auditorium of Theodore Roosevelt High School.

Beginning in the 1920s Wyandotte was a major source of toy production, with the All Metal Products Company founded in 1920 and located in Wyandotte on Sycamore Street between 14th and 15th streets. From the 1920s until the 1950s the company, under the name "Wyandotte Toys", was the largest manufacturer of toy guns and pistols in the US, producing a wide variety of pop guns, clicker pistols, dart guns, cap guns and a variety of plastic pistols. The company also produced a wide range of toy airplanes and other vehicles by pressing scrap metal obtained from local automobile factories. The company's motto was "Wyandotte Toys Are Good and Safe." In the early 1950s the company moved to Ohio, and it was bought out by Louis Marx and Company three years later.

Bishop Park, located on the riverfront north of downtown, once had a dock to board the Boblo Boat ferry to Boblo Island.

Today, much of the remaining industry is minor, with a notable exception being BASF Wyandotte on the city's north riverfront.

In July 2002, three workers at an Atofina plant in neighboring Riverview were killed when a rail car leaked a colorless gas called methyl mercaptan.  The gas exploded into flames and led to the emergency evacuation of 3,100 area residents, including some Wyandotte citizens.

The city is served by three newspapers: the regional Detroit Free Press and The Detroit News; as well as The News-Herald, which is a more local paper serving the Downriver communities and has roots tracing back to two former newspapers that were published in Wyandotte. Wyandotte is also in the Detroit radio and television markets.

Government and municipal services

Robert DeSana is the current acting Mayor of Wyandotte. A City Council and other elected officials oversee the community's governance. Wyandotte has its own community owned municipal services, called Wyandotte Municipal Services, it provides its own power through a municipal power plant and operates city-owned water and cable television services.

The Wyandotte Police Department, like that of its fellow Downriver community Woodhaven, has a Police Explorers post for youths ages 14–21 that have an interest in law enforcement.

Wyandotte's community is served by the Bacon Memorial District Library, a member of the tri-county library system The Library Network. Built out of the Ford-Bacon House on Vinewood Street, it replaced the Wyandotte Carnegie Library in 1942; following the death of Congressman Mark R. Bacon, his widow Mary Ford-Bacon deeded the building to the city. The staff offer guided tours through the historic part of the building.

Education

Public schools
Wyandotte Public Schools operates the city's public schools. Since 1901, all schools are named for former US presidents.

Elementary and middle schools include:
Garfield Elementary School, built in 1932
James Monroe Elementary School, built in 1954
George Washington Elementary School, built in the 1930s
Thomas Jefferson Elementary School, built in 1950
Middle schools include:
Woodrow Wilson Middle School, built in 1956

Wyandotte's public high school is Theodore Roosevelt High School, which began construction in 1921, was completed in 1923, and has since been expanded four times.

Catholic schools
Currently there are no Catholic schools open in Wyandotte. These are the schools that were formerly open: Our Lady of Mount Carmel Elementary and High School, St. Stanislaus Kostka Elementary School, St. Patrick Elementary and High School, St, Elizabeth Elementary School, St. Joseph Elementary School, and St. Helena Elementary School; also, Wyandotte Catholic Consolidated School (After the consolidation of Sts. Elizabeth, Patrick, and Joseph) were previously in the community. They were a part of the Roman Catholic Archdiocese of Detroit.

Wyandotte Consolidated formed in 1970 from the merger of St. Elizabeth, St. Joseph, and St. Patrick Schools. It closed in 2011 after a downturn in the economy.

Sports and recreation
The city is home to the Wyandotte Boat Club, a rowing facility. The club host to three local regattas: two spring high school regattas and one fall club regatta.  The new facility features two indoor rowing tanks, numerous shell racks and shells, erg and weight rooms, men's and women's locker rooms, meeting room, and a massive club/bar over looking the Detroit River. The tanks are used by all of the rowing programs for technique and style training. They have been shown to be of great benefit in the training of novice rowers. During the off season, the tanks are rented by the hour to outside schools and universities. The city has 23 parks in total with the largest being Bishop Park. Pets, bikes and alcohol are prohibited in all Wyandotte city parks. Rollerblades and skateboards are prohibited in all areas except the Wyandotte Skate Park.

F.O.P. Park
Located at the corner of Bondie and 8th Streets, the F.O.P. Park has a large shaded playground and covered pavilion for picnicking. Sports facilities include a basketball court, baseball diamond and two horseshoe pits. The Park has a 66% satisfaction rating out of 45 people surveyed.

F.O.P. Park holds youth baseball and softball games during day and night for the Wyandotte Braves Association. Restroom facilities that are opened during baseball games and other special events.

Kiwanis Park
Kiwanis Park is named in honor of the Kiwanis Club of Wyandotte, which is the town's oldest civic non-profit organization. The Kiwanis Club continues to make an annual contribution to the upkeep of the Park. The Park is located at the intersection of 6th Street and North Drive, and has no restroom facilities.

Lions Club Park 
The Lions Club Park is located at the intersection of Vinewood and 9th Avenue next to Our Lady of the Scapular Religious Education Office. It was first opened on August 12, 2009 by the Lions Club. The park is completely enclosed with fences and has benches situated all around it. There is a large playscape and climbing terrace. The hours are 6:00 am to 10:00 pm, year round.

Oak Club Park
The Oak Club Park is at the corner of 20th Street and Vinewood. It has a large shaded area,  a playground and basketball court. A small picnic area, water fountain and pavilion are located in the park, which is open from 6am to 10pm year round.

Pulaski Park
Pulaski Park is at the corner of 12 Street and Oxford Court. It hosts multiple softball and baseball fields, two basketball courts, and four tennis courts. Hours are 6:00 am to 10:00 pm, year round.

The Park is named in honor of Count Casimir Pulaski, a statue of whom was dedicated in the park in 1938.

V.F.W Playfield
V.F.W Playfield is a moderate sized park located at the corner of 11th and Cherry. It has a baseball diamond, a very large open field, swings, and a playscape. There is also a covered pavilion. It is located next to Silver Lining Tire Recycling. The hours are 6:00 am to 10:00 pm, year round. Pets, bikes, skateboards and rollerblades are not permitted in the park. Alcohol is not permitted in the park. It is owned by the Veterans Of Foreign Wars, (V.F.W), in Wyandotte.

WAA Park
A smaller park located on Highland and Alfred street in the north end of Wyandotte, it has a playground and swing sets, an open play space for sports and other activities. There is a covered pavilion and benches and a sand pit. It is owned by the Wyandotte Athletic Association. The hours are 6:00 am to 10:00 pm, year round.

Transportation

Public transportation
Three Suburban Mobility Authority for Regional Transportation bus routes pass through the city of Wyandotte, providing service seven days a week.

Highways
, known locally as Fort Street, runs south–north and forms most of the westernmost boundary of the city.

Demographics

2010 census
As of the census of 2010, there were 25,883 people, 10,991 households, and 6,727 families residing in the city. The racial makeup of the city was 94.7% White, 1.3% African American, 0.7% Native American, 0.5% Asian, 0.9% from other races, and 1.9% from two or more races. Hispanic or Latino of any race were 5.1% of the population.

There were 10,991 households, of which 28.4% had children under the age of 18 living with them, 42.6% were married couples living together, 13.2% had a female householder with no husband present, 5.4% had a male householder with no wife present, and 38.8% were non-families. 33.0% of all households were made up of individuals, and 12.8% had someone living alone who was 65 years of age or older. The average household size was 2.35 and the average family size was 2.99.

The median age in the city was 40.4 years. 21.4% of residents were under the age of 18; 8.5% were between the ages of 18 and 24; 26.4% were from 25 to 44; 29.9% were from 45 to 64; and 13.8% were 65 years of age or older. The gender makeup of the city was 48.9% male and 51.1% female.

2000 census
As of the census of 2000, there were 28,006 people, 11,816 households, and 7,420 families residing in the city. The racial makeup of the city was 96.32% White, 0.52% African American, 0.49% Native American, 0.33% Asian, 0.03% Pacific Islander, 0.72% from other races, and 1.59% from two or more races. Hispanic or Latino of any race were 2.91% of the population. Residents are predominantly of Polish descent.

There were 11,816 households, out of which 27.7% had children under the age of 18 living with them, 46.3% were married couples living together, 11.9% had a female householder with no husband present, and 37.2% were non-families. 31.9% of all households were made up of individuals, and 13.3% had someone living alone who was 65 years of age or older.  The average household size was 2.36 and the average family size was 2.99.

In the city, the population was spread out, with 22.6% under the age of 18, 8.3% from 18 to 24, 31.6% from 25 to 44, 21.7% from 45 to 64, and 15.7% who were 65 years of age or older.  The median age was 38 years. For every 100 females, there were 96.0 males.  For every 100 females age 18 and over, there were 93.5 males.

Ancestries (2000): Polish (22.5%), German (21.9%), Irish (17.5%), English (9.0%), French (8.5%), Italian (8.4%).

The median income for a household in the city was $43,740, and the median income for a family was $54,106. Males had a median income of $42,469 versus $27,261 for females. The per capita income for the city was $22,185.  About 4.7% of families and 6.2% of the population were below the poverty line, including 8.7% of those under age 18 and 4.0% of those age 65 or over.

Notable people
 Amy Faye Hayes, ring announcer and model.
 Lucille Ball, actress who was raised in the city as a child
 Joe Carollo, tackle for Notre Dame and NFL's Los Angeles Rams
 Dick Dean, born Richard Dean Sawitskas, automobile designer and builder of custom cars
 Aaron Diaz, science popularizer and creator of the comic Dresden Codak
 Gwen Frostic, artist and author
 Justin Hicks, professional golfer
 Denise R. Johnson, first woman appointed to Vermont Supreme Court
 Jeff Kaiser, former pitcher for the Cleveland Indians.
 Connie Kreski, 1969 Playboy Playmate of the Year
 Bob Kuzava, baseball pitcher for New York Yankees in three World Series
 Bill Lajoie, general manager of 1984 World Series champion Detroit Tigers
 Budd Lynch, the Detroit Red Wings' public address announcer at Joe Louis Arena
 Lee Majors, actor most noted as The Six Million Dollar Man and The Fall Guy
 Gerald Mayhew, professional ice hockey player
 Ann Penelope Marston, archery champion and Miss America 1960 pageant contestant
 John Martin, baseball pitcher for St. Louis Cardinals
 Thomas McGuane, novelist, screenwriter known for such works as Ninety-Two in the Shade and The Missouri Breaks, husband of actress Margot Kidder
 Ed Mierkowicz, baseball outfielder for Detroit Tigers in 1940s
 Jenny Romatowski, baseball player, All-American Girls Professional Baseball League
 Soony Saad, Lebanese-American professional soccer player
 John Schreiber, baseball pitcher for the Detroit Tigers
 Matt Shoemaker, baseball pitcher for Toronto Blue Jays
 Fritz Shurmur, football coach for five NFL teams
 Craig Titus, former IFBB bodybuilding champion and convicted murderer
 Louis A. Waldman, art historian specializing in Italian Renaissance

References

Sources

External links

City of Wyandotte official website
Wyandotte Schools
Wyandotte Municipal Services

 
Cities in Wayne County, Michigan
Metro Detroit
1867 establishments in Michigan
Populated places established in 1867
Sundown towns in Michigan
Michigan populated places on the Detroit River